Principality of Transylvania can refer to:

 Principality of Transylvania (1570–1711), a semi-independent state
 Principality of Transylvania (1711–1867) (from 1765 Grand Principality of Transylvania)

See also
 Transylvania, the historical region
 Transylvania (disambiguation)
 Transylvanian (disambiguation)